Katarina Mirabelle Roxon  (born April 5, 1993) is a Paralympic Swimming Champion from Canada. In 2016 she won a gold medal in the 100 metre breaststroke at the 2016 Summer Paralympics in Rio de Janeiro and was the only representative of Canada there in S9, SB8 and SM9 disability classifications. She won a bronze medal at the 2020 Summer Paralympics, in Women's 34pts 4x100m relay.

Career
Roxon finished on top in the 100-metre breaststroke finals. Her father and coach Leonard Roxon left Vellore-India for Canada with his wife Lisa in 1990. She has bagged several medals in various championships.

In 2017 she swam 200-metre individual medley at the Canadian Swimming Championships and won two medals, one of which was gold.

Achievements
2008 Paralympic Games 12th 100-m breaststroke
2010 Commonwealth Games 6th 50-m freestyle, 5th 100-m freestyle and 100-m butterfly
2012 Paralympic Games 5th 100-m breaststroke
2014 Commonwealth Games 5th 100-m breaststroke and 200-m individual medley
2014 Pan Pacific Para-swimming Championships 2nd 200-m individual medley
2014 Pan Pacific Para-swimming Championships 1st 100-m breaststroke
2015 East Coast Short Course Swimming Championships - World Record 200m Butterfly

Recognitions
Roxon was included on the "2016 Most Influential Women List" by the Canadian Association for the Advancement of Women and Sport and Physical Activity.

Roxon with "nubs up" friends and fellow medalists on the podium at the 2016 Rio Paralympics Games selected as one of the 52 best pictures of the Rio Paralympics by Business Insider Magazine.

Katarina Roxon was selected for Women's History Month in Canada as one of the most influential women who is making history in Newfoundland & Labrador and in Canada.

Roxon is a Community Hero in the province of Newfoundland and Labrador.

In 2016 she was a speaker at the Easter Seals Canada.

In 2018, Roxon was appointed to the Order of Newfoundland and Labrador.

Legacy
KATARINA ROXON WAY - Highway (Route 490) named after Katarina Roxon.

References

External links
 
 
 

1993 births
Living people
Canadian female backstroke swimmers
Canadian female breaststroke swimmers
Canadian female butterfly swimmers
Canadian female freestyle swimmers
Canadian female medley swimmers
Paralympic swimmers of Canada
S9-classified Paralympic swimmers
Swimmers at the 2008 Summer Paralympics
Swimmers at the 2012 Summer Paralympics
Swimmers at the 2016 Summer Paralympics
Swimmers at the 2010 Commonwealth Games
Swimmers at the 2014 Commonwealth Games
Swimmers at the 2018 Commonwealth Games
Medalists at the 2016 Summer Paralympics
Medalists at the World Para Swimming Championships
Paralympic medalists in swimming
Paralympic gold medalists for Canada
Commonwealth Games competitors for Canada
Medalists at the 2007 Parapan American Games
Medalists at the 2015 Parapan American Games
Members of the Order of Newfoundland and Labrador
Swimmers at the 2022 Commonwealth Games
21st-century Canadian women